The Unity Party was the ruling party of Kingdom of Hungary from 1922 to 1944.

It was founded in early 1922, and in the same year they won a electoral landslide in the parliamentary election. Initially, the party was conservative and agrarian but in the early 1930s its fascist faction grew to become the largest, and shortly after they established a militia. The main leader of the fascist faction was Gyula Gömbös, who served as the prime minister from 1932 to 1936. When he came to power, the party was renamed to National Unity Party.

Gömbös declared the party's intention to achieve "total control of the nation's social life". In the 1935 Hungarian Election, Gömbös promoted the creation of a "unitary Hungarian nation with no class distinctions". The party won a huge majority of the seats of the Hungarian parliament in the Hungarian election of May 1939. It won 72 percent of the parliament's seats and won 49 percent of the popular vote in the election. This was a major breakthrough for the far-right in Hungary. The party promoted nationalist propaganda and some of its members sympathized with the Nazi Arrow Cross Party. In 1939, the party was renamed to the Party of Hungarian Life.

It was also called "the Government Party" since it was the governing party of the Kingdom of Hungary during the existence of the Horthy era.

Electoral results

National Assembly

References 

Christian political parties in Hungary
Conservative parties in Hungary
Defunct political parties in Hungary
Far-right political parties in Hungary
Political parties established in 1922
Catholic political parties
National conservative parties
Nationalist parties in Hungary
Fascist parties